The Strathord Islands are an uninhabited island group of five islands in the Louisiade Archipelago of Papua New Guinea. Politically they belong to the province of Milne Bay in the southeastern region of Papua New Guinea .

The islands are located about 100 km northwest of Misima and form the northernmost group of Louisiade archipelago. They are among the Bonvouloir Islands which include two other islands to the south.

The main island—Strathord Island, also known as Pana Mole—lies on the southern part of the reef. The group is heavily forested and flat. Strathord was inhabited by two families from Ewena until 2013. Nowadays, they come a couple of times a year to collect yams and coconuts from their gardens.

References

Archipelagoes of Papua New Guinea
Islands of Milne Bay Province
Louisiade Archipelago